Standing Together may refer to:

 Standing Together (George Benson album), 1998
 Standing Together (Midnight Star album), 1981